"Wheels" is a song written by Dave Loggins, and originally recorded by American country music duo The Bellamy Brothers for their 1985 album Howard & David. It was later recorded by American country music group Restless Heart and released in October 1987 as the fourth and final single from the album Wheels. The song was Restless Heart's fourth number-one country single. The single went to number one for one week and spent 23 weeks on the chart.

The B-side, "New York (Hold Her Tight)", peaked at number 23 on the Adult Contemporary chart.

Charts

Weekly charts

Year-end charts

References

1985 songs
1987 singles
The Bellamy Brothers songs
Restless Heart songs
Songs written by Dave Loggins
Song recordings produced by Scott Hendricks
RCA Records Nashville singles